Master Series is a compilation album by the British synthpop band Visage released in 1997.

Background
The album was released only in continental Europe as a part of the Master Series collection, and it is now one of the most hard-to-find Visage records. The compilation includes most of the band's UK singles as well as rare tracks "In the Year 2525" (a 1978 cover of Zager and Evans' original), "We Move" (1983 remix by John Hudson) and "Der Amboss", the German-language version of "The Anvil". Master Series also featured 2 album tracks from Visage and 3 from Beat Boy, remaining (until March 2009) the only way to find album tracks from the Beat Boy album on digital format. Track 15, "Motivation", was added to the track listing by mistake and is not a Visage song but the instrumental version of the Motivation track Motivation (Are You Ready).

Track listing
"Fade to Grey" (Billy Currie, Midge Ure, Chris Payne) – 3:49
"Damned Don't Cry" (Steve Strange, M. Ure, B. Currie, Rusty Egan, Dave Formula) – 3:55
"Love Glove" (S. Strange, R. Egan, Steve Barnacle) – 4:00
"Mind of a Toy" (S. Strange, M. Ure, B. Currie, John McGeoch, R. Egan, D. Formula) – 3:32
"Der Amboss" (S. Strange, M. Ure, B. Currie, R. Egan, D. Formula) – 5:37
"Questions" (S. Strange, R. Egan, S. Barnacle) – 6:11
"Visage" (S. Strange, M. Ure, B. Currie, J. McGeoch, R. Egan, D. Formula) – 3:47
"The Promise" (S. Strange, R. Egan, S. Barnacle, Andy Barnett) – 3:59
"In the Year 2525" (Rick Evans) – 3:41
"The Anvil" (S. Strange, M. Ure, B. Currie, R. Egan, D. Formula) – 4:26
"Beat Boy" (S. Strange, R. Egan, S. Barnacle, D. Formula, A. Barnett) – 6:46
"The Steps" (Instrumental) (S. Strange, M. Ure, B. Currie, J. McGeoch, R. Egan, D. Formula) – 3:14
"We Move" (Remix) (S. Strange, M. Ure, B. Currie, J. McGeoch, R. Egan, D. Formula) – 3:45
"Only the Good Die Young" (S. Strange, R. Egan, S. Barnacle, D. Formula, A. Barnett, B. Currie) – 5:58
"Motivation" (Instrumental) – 5:46
"Blocks on Blocks" (S. Strange, M. Ure, B. Currie, J. McGeoch, R. Egan, D. Formula) – 4:00

References

1997 compilation albums
Albums produced by Midge Ure
Polydor Records compilation albums
Visage (band) albums